The Stages of Life is an  allegorical oil painting of 1835 by the German Romantic landscape painter Caspar David Friedrich. Completed just five years before his death, this picture, like many of his works, forms a meditation both on his own mortality and on the transience of life.

The painting is set on a sea shore and shows in the foreground an aged man with his back turned to the viewer, walking towards two adults and two children on a hilltop overlooking a harbour. The figures are echoed by five ships shown in the harbour, each at a different distance from the shore, an allegorical reference to the different stages of human life, to the end of a journey, to the closeness of death.

Although many of Friedrich's paintings are set in imagined landscapes, The Stages of Life is recognisably located at Utkiek, near his birthplace of Greifswald in today's northeastern Germany. The figures have been identified as Friedrich and his family. The aged man is the artist himself, the young boy is his son Gustav Adolf, the young girl is his daughter Agnes Adelheid, the older girl is his daughter Emma, and the man in the top hat is his nephew Johann Heinrich.

Description
The painting depicts a Baltic Sea port in the dusk. On the sea three sailing ships returning home can be seen; the large ship in the middle has already begun to draw in its sails. Two smaller sailboats have almost reached land. The one on the right heads directly for the group of five people on the bank, who by their clothes are recognizable as townspeople. In their midst sits a boy who holds up a Swedish pennant, while the girl beside him reaches for it. To their right sits a woman who leans toward both children with her right hand raised.

These five figures correspond to the five ships visible in the harbour beyond. The three groupings of figures (one aged man, two adults, and two children) echo the positioning of the ships at various distances from the shore as allegorical of the stages of life, and closeness to death. The central ship is thought to represent the mother, while further inshore, two small boats—references to the two children—have only just begun their voyage and still remain in shallow, clear water. To the horizon, the farthest ship disappears into the setting horizon, symbolizing the aged man's voyage from this life into the unknown. 

Alternatively, other critics have interpreted the two ships in the distance as the mother and father sailing off to live their lives and gain experience and wisdom as parents, and the large ship closest to the shore as the old man - one who has lived a full life, built up many experiences and is finally pulling into the harbor at the end of life.

The group forms a semicircle: the children are on its farthest point; to their left and right are a younger man and the young woman. On the extreme left an older man stands looking straight ahead, outside the circle. The women and children are dressed for summer, while the old man wears a coat and a fur hat. The bow of the big ship in the middle is exactly aligned with the two children.

Swedish pennant

Friedrich's home town of Greifswald belonged to the Duchy of Pomerania until 1630, when the area passed to Sweden as Swedish Pomerania. In 1815 it became part of Prussian Province of Pomerania. The painting shows Friedrich's younger daughter Agnes Adelheid and his son Gustav Adolf holding a Swedish pennant 20 years after the cession of Greifswald to Prussia. The view encompasses the peninsula in front of the Baltic Sea, beyond which lies Sweden. Friedrich christened his son Gustav Adolf, after the Swedish king Gustav Adolf IV. The Swedish writer Per Daniel Amadeus Atterbom wrote of the painter,

Title
In keeping with the Romantic ideals of the time, Friedrich intended his paintings to function purely in visual terms, and thus he was cautious that the titles given to his work were not overly descriptive or evocative. It is likely that the relatively literal title The Stages of Life was not given by the artist himself, but that the work was instead renamed during a revival of interest in the artist in the late 19th or early 20th century.

See also
List of works by Caspar David Friedrich

Notes

References
 Börsch-Supan, Helmut & Jähnig, Karl Wilhelm, 1973: Caspar David Friedrich. Gemälde, Druckgraphik und bildmäßige Zeichnungen. Munich: Prestel Verlag. 
 Schmied, Wieland, 1992. Caspar David Friedrich. Cologne: DuMont. 
 Schmied, Wieland, 1999: Harenberg Museum der Malerei. 525 Meisterwerke aus sieben Jahrhunderten. Dortmund: Harenberg Lexikon Verlag. 
 Siegel, Linda, 1978: Caspar David Friedrich and the Age of German Romanticism. Branden Publishing Co. .
 Vaughan, William, 1994: German Romantic Painting (2nd edn). Yale University Press. 
 Vaughan, William, 2004: Friedrich. London: Phaidon Press. 
 Wolf, Norbert, 2003: Friedrich. Cologne: Taschen.

External links

Paintings by Caspar David Friedrich
1835 paintings
Maritime paintings
19th-century allegorical paintings
Allegorical paintings by German artists
Paintings in Leipzig
Flags in art